Surjagad is a small village near Etapalli. There is a yearly festival known as 'Surjagad Yatra' in first week of January. It is a major festival for the Madia Tribes in Bhamragad and Etapalli Talukas of Gadchiroli District. Deity of God is situated in a dense forest and hilly area. This place is only accessible during this there is iron mining also.

References 

Villages in Gadchiroli district